Glenfarclas distillery is a Speyside whisky distillery in Ballindalloch, Scotland. Glenfarclas translates as meaning valley of the green grass. The distillery is owned and run by the Grant family.  The distillery has six stills which are the largest on Speyside and are heated directly by gas burners.

The distillery has a production capacity of around 4 million litres of spirit per year. Normally four stills are used for production with two kept in reserve.

The distillery has approximately 68,000 casks maturing on site, in traditional dunnage warehouses, with stock from every year from 1953 to the current year. Glenfarclas produce a traditional Highland malt with a heavy sherry influence.

History
There is evidence that the distillery first started operations sometime before 1791. The distillery was first granted a licence in 1836 when it was run by Robert Hay.  On 8 June 1865 it was bought by John Grant and is still owned and run by his descendants, making it truly independent.

John Grant sent his son George G. Grant to run the operations at Glenfarclas.
In 1890, on the death of George G. Grant, his widow Elsie took over the licence for the distillery.

At some time over the following years, Elsie handed active management of the Distillery to her sons John and George.
The Grants formed a partnership with Pattisons Ltd in August 1896 at the height of the whisky boom. After the crash that followed, the Grants resumed full ownership of the distillery.
John retired due to ill health in 1913 and George became sole proprietor. In 1947 Glenfarclas became a private limited company, owned by George's sons, George S. Grant and John P. Grant.

John L.S. Grant, who joined Glenfarclas in 1973, is the current chairman. The company was named Distiller of the Year by Whisky Magazine in 2006, 2020 and 2023 .

Since 2006 Glenfarclas has been distributed in the UK by Pol Roger Ltd. In 2008 the company began sponsoring horseracing with the Glenfarclas Cross Country Handicap Chase at Cheltenham.  In 2011, the 40-year-old 46% vol. expression was named "Scotch Whisky Single Malt of the Year" in the 17th Annual Malt Advocate Whisky Awards. In May 2022, thieves broke into the distillery's visitor center and stole more than £100,000 worth of whisky.

Proprietary bottlings

Glenfarclas is produced in the following proprietary bottlings:

8-year-old 40% ABV
10-year-old 40% ABV
12-year-old 43% ABV
15-year-old 46% ABV
17-year-old 43% ABV
21-year-old 43% ABV (bottling currently suspended)
25-year-old 43% ABV
30-year-old 43% ABV
40-year-old 46% ABV
105 (Cask Strength) 60% ABV

In 2007 Glenfarclas launched The Family Casks, a collection of 43 single cask bottlings, with one from every year from 1952 to 1994. This collection now extends to 2007, but the distillery no longer has stock of casks from 1952 and 1953.

In June 2015, Glenfarclas released a limited edition bottling called the £511.19s.0d Family Reserve. This was launched to mark 150 years of the Grant Family owning the distillery. The name of this bottling references the price John Grant paid for the distillery in 1865. The bottle is sold with a copy of the original bill of sale for the distillery.

Also in 2015, Glenfarclas released a limited edition line of their 60-year-old bottle. Glenfarclas confirmed that there were only 360 bottles released globally. Crafted in a first fill sherry butt, the vibrant and full-bodied flavour produced from this 60-year-old dram is from one of their last 1953 casks.

Visitor Centre

Glenfarclas was one of the first distilleries to open a visitor centre in 1973. Today the visitor centre is open on weekdays throughout the year and Saturdays from July to September.

The visitor centre includes the "Ship's Room", a tasting room, with panelling from the RMS Empress of Australia - this ship was of historical importance for ferrying the last British troops home from Bombay, after they had symbolically passed through the Gateway of India, bringing an end to over two centuries of British imperial rule in India.

Future 
On 3 August 2021, the distillery was given approval to construct two whisky warehouses.

See also
 List of whisky brands
 List of distilleries in Scotland
 Glenfarclas Cross Country Handicap Chase

References

Notes

Bibliography

External links
 Official website

Distilleries in Scotland
1836 establishments in Scotland
Companies based in Moray
Food and drink companies established in 1836
Scottish malt whisky